Fallzone (formerly Seven Wiser) is a four-piece alternative rock band from Jersey City, New Jersey.

History

As Seven Wiser 
Seven Wiser was founded in 2002 by producer/songwriter Sandy Thomas, Andrew Sbarra, and frontman Jon Santos who, at the time, used to record demos at a local studio. They were signed to Wind-up Records, in which the band released their debut self-titled album in June 2004. According to Sound Scan, Seven Wiser has been able to sound scan 10,000 copies of their debut album in the few months with the label. Wind-Up dropped the band later that same year.

The band signed up with Crash Records, around the time the band has finished their second album Stronger in 2007. The album was released for download on March 25, 2008. The band was dropped from the label two days later. The band subsequently broke up in August 2008,  because of musical differences, difficulty booking gigs, and failed record deals. After the break-up, vocalist Jon Santos pursued a solo career and re-released "Stronger" in October 2008, excluding the track "This Time" in favor of a new song, "Losing Grip" and includes a piano mix of the title track "Stronger".

As Fallzone
In early 2009, the band formed back together under the new name "Fallzone". The album "Stronger", which was previously issued twice, was once again re-released under the new band name in April 2009, featuring a new single, "Never Gonna Be Alone".

The second album with the Fallzone name, The Long Road, was released June 2011.

Band members
Current
 Jon Santos – Vocals
 Bill Lau – Guitar
 Jerry Keating – Drums

Past Seven Wiser members / touring musicians
 Joe Belle – Guitar
 Tudor Capusan – Guitar
 Ben Gramm – Drums
 Oliver Hoffer – Bass
 John Signorella – Drums
 Bobby Angilletta - Drums
 Rob Ellis – Bass

Discography

Singles

References

External links 
 Seven Wiser Myspace site
 Fallzone Myspace site
 Fallzone Facebook site
 Jon Santos Myspace site

American post-grunge musical groups